The Scotiabank Theatre Toronto (formerly Paramount Theatre Toronto) is a major movie theatre at the RioCan Hall in the Entertainment District of downtown Toronto, Ontario, Canada at Richmond and John Street owned by Cineplex Entertainment  for the building and the lands owned by RioCan. Opened in 1999, the venue screens theatrical films throughout the year, but is best known as one of the major venues for the annual Toronto International Film Festival alongside the nearby TIFF Bell Lightbox.

Description
Scotiabank Theatre Toronto has a total of 14 auditoriums, including one with an IMAX screen, six with 3D screen, one UltraAVX auditorium with D-Box and a ScreenX auditorium. The auditoriums and amenities are located on the third floor of the complex, accessed by escalator and elevator, though the escalator is often out of service. The box office and the theatre entrance is located on Richmond Street West. The box office and escalator areas were decorated with large spaceships from the Star Trek series of films, but the ships were removed and disposed of in August, 2018.

History

The theatre opened on May 19, 1999 as the Paramount Theatre Toronto with the release of Star Wars: Episode I – The Phantom Menace. The multiplex opened with 14 screens and 4,500 seats, and Toronto's first 3-D IMAX screen. The Paramount Theatre banner was the trademark of Paramount Pictures, the film studio of the former owner Famous Players' parent company Viacom. In 2005, Viacom sold Famous Players to Cinema Galaxy Income Fund — owner of Cineplex Galaxy Cinemas — creating the company Cineplex Entertainment. The theatre was rebranded as Scotiabank Theatre Toronto, under a sponsorship arrangement with Canadian bank Scotiabank. 

The theatre was built as part of the  RioCan Hall complex (formerly Festival Hall) and planning for the complex and theatre started in 1994. The RioCan Hall also contains a Milestones Grill and Bar, and а Marshalls store. Until May 2014, the space housed a flagship Chapters store. From October 2007 until early 2010, the hall also housed CiRCA nightclub. Before CiRCA, the first tenant was the Playdium family entertainment centre. Though the nightclub and entertainment centre are now closed, Playdium also opened a smaller TechTown arcade in the movie theatre, which remains operational to this day as a Cinescape arcade.

The theatre hosts the Toronto After Dark Film Festival annually. The festival moved to the Scotiabank Theatre in 2013. The festival is a showcase of horror, sci-fi,  action and cult cinema.

The venue opened with a film-based IMAX 3D projector.  In recent years, this was replaced to feature an IMAX with Laser projector instead. The laser projection system was the first in Canada and one of two in North America. One of the auditoriums was upgraded to UltraAVX by December 2010. This screen is about 1.32 times larger than a regular movie screen. Later, this auditorium had D-Box motion seats installed as an optional upgrade. Another auditorium was converted to the Barco Escape premium large format in July 2016, as one of three Cineplex locations to add the format. Star Trek Beyond was the first film played in this auditorium, with 20 minutes of the film being optimized for this format.

In November 2017, an IMAX VR virtual reality centre opened at Scotiabank Theatre Toronto, as the pilot program's first location in Canada. The centre included several cubicles offering access to VR games and experiences, using either HTC Vive or StarVR hardware. In December 2018, IMAX announced that it would be shuttering the IMAX VR project and closing all remaining locations in early-2019.

References

External links

 Official website

Cinemas and movie theatres in Toronto
Cineplex Entertainment
Scotiabank
Toronto International Film Festival